Night's Watch is a 2012 role-playing game supplement published by Green Ronin Publishing for A Song of Ice and Fire Roleplaying.

Contents
Night's Watch details the members of the Night's Watch guard.

Reception
Night's Watch won the 2013 Origins Award for Best Roleplaying Supplement.

Night's Watch won the 2013 Gold ENnie Award for Best Aid/Accessory.

References

ENnies winners
Fantasy role-playing game supplements
Origins Award winners
Role-playing game supplements introduced in 2012